Jana Jamal Mousa Abu Ghosh (born 8 January 2001), known as Jana Abu Ghosh, is a Jordanian footballer who plays as a midfielder for the Jordan women's national team.

International goals
Scores and results list Jordan's goal tally first.

References

External links

2001 births
Living people
Jordan women's international footballers
Jordanian women's footballers
Women's association football midfielders
Sportspeople from Amman
Jordan Women's Football League players